LME Aluminium (or LME Aluminum in American and Canadian English) stands for a group of spot, forward, and futures contracts, trading on the London Metal Exchange (LME), for delivery of primary Aluminium that can be used for price hedging, physical delivery of sales or purchases, investment, and speculation. Producers, semi-fabricators, consumers, recyclers, and merchants can use Aluminium futures contracts to hedge Aluminium price risks and to reference prices. Notable companies that use LME Aluminium contracts to hedge Aluminium prices include General Motors, Boeing, and Alcoa.

As of late 2019, the system of LME Aluminium contracts is associated with 1.27 to 1.49 million tonnes of physical primary Aluminium stored in 500 to 700 warehouses around the world, out of 2.78 million tonnes of global reported warehoused Aluminium, and 11.78 million tonnes of global reported and unreported warehoused Aluminium. For comparison, world production of primary Aluminium in 2019 is 63.70 million tonnes, which implies that physical Aluminium tied up in the LME warehouse system for LME Aluminium contracts only makes up between 2.0% to 2.3% of world annual production. Despite the low amount of physical Aluminium tied to the LME contracts, they have become an important source of hedging and price discovery.

Contract description
LME Aluminium contracts trade on the London Metal Exchange, which introduced them in 1978.
The contracts require physical delivery of the asset for settlement, and deliverable assets for the contracts are 25 tonnes of high grade primary Aluminium. The contracts prices are quoted in US dollars per tonne. LME prices have minimum tick sizes of $0.50 per tonne (or $12.50 for one contract) for open outcry trading in the LME Ring and electronic trading on LMEselect, while minimum tick sizes are reduced for inter-office telephone trading to $0.01 per tonne (or $0.50 for one contract). Carry trades involving Aluminium futures also have reduced minimum tick sizes at $0.01 per tonne. Contracts are organized along LME's prompt date (or delivery date) structure.

Prompt date structure
LME offers three groups of LME Aluminium contracts with daily, weekly, and monthly delivery dates. Contracts with daily settlement dates are available from two days to three months in the future, which means that on 2020-05-12, contracts with daily delivery dates for 2020-05-14, 2020-05-18, 2020-05-19 ... 2020-08-10, 2020-08-11, and 2020-08-12 are available for trading. Contracts with weekly settlement dates are available from three months to six months in the future, which means that on 2020-05-12, contracts with weekly delivery dates for 2020-08-12, 2020-08-19, 2020-08-26 ... 2020-11-12, 2020-11-18, and 2020-11-25 are available for trading. Contracts with monthly settlement dates are available from six months to 123 months in the future, which means that on 2020-05-12, contracts with monthly delivery dates for 2020-05-20, 2020-06-17, 2020-07-15, ... 2020-06-19, 2020-07-17, and 2030-08-21 are available for trading.

Secondary Uses
LME Aluminium futures contract prices serves as a platform for Aluminium price discovery because futures markets are more publicly visible and more accessible, due to lower transaction costs, for a larger number of buyers and sellers than the cash market. A larger number of buyers and sellers in the futures market allows those market participants to incorporate more demand and supply information into the futures price compared with the cash price. Cash markets are also more susceptible to the exercise of market power by large buyers and sellers, while such market power is less effective in futures markets where there are more participants and where price information is publicly available. For all of these reasons and more, LME Aluminium futures contract prices (and other Aluminium futures prices) become reference prices for Aluminium transaction prices in general.

LME Aluminium futures prices are also a part of both the Bloomberg Commodity Index and the S&P GSCI commodity index, which are benchmark indices widely followed in financial markets by traders and institutional investors. Its weighting in these commodity indices give LME Aluminium prices non-trivial influence on returns on a wide range of investment funds and portfolios.

Related derivatives
LME also offers other derivatives related to primary Aluminium. Options, TAPOs, Monthly Average Futures, and LMEminis. Aluminium products like Aluminium alloys and Alumina also have their own LME contracts for trading.

Aluminum contracts are also available for trading on the Chicago Mercantile Exchange (CME). The CME Aluminium futures contract are for 25 metric tonnes of primary Aluminium and prices are quoted in US dollars per tonne. 60 consecutive monthly CME Aluminium contracts are available for trading.

The Shanghai Futures Exchange (SHFE) offers Aluminum futures contracts for trading as well, SHFE contracts are for 5 metric tonnes of primary Aluminum and prices are quoted in Yuan per tonne.

Warehouse controversy
Physical Aluminium warehouse stocks associated with LME Aluminium futures contracts have been at the center of a number of controversies. In 2013, a number of Aluminium users filed three lawsuits against the LME, Metro International Trade Services (Metro) - a LME approved warehouse operator, Glencore Xstrata, JPMorgan Chase & Co, Glencore Plc, and other commodity companies for colluding from 2009 to 2012 to manipulate Aluminium and Aliuminium premium prices by hoarding Aluminium inventory. Separately, the United States Senate Permanent Subcommittee on Investigations investigated the role of Goldman Sachs in the Aluminium market. These lawsuits and investigations centers on Goldman Sach's ownership of LME warehouses, and the buildup of Aluminium warrants in those warehouses to execute LME Aluminium futures contracts.

References 

Futures markets